The PMPC Star Awards for Best News Program are given to the best television newscasts of the year and also male and female newscasters in the Philippines.

Winners

Best News Program

1987: TV Patrol (ABS-CBN 2)

1988:

1989: GMA Balita (GMA 7)

1990:

1991: GMA Balita (GMA 7)

1992: TV Patrol (ABS-CBN 2)

1993: GMA Network News (GMA-7)

1994: GMA Balita (GMA 7)

1995: GMA Network News (GMA-7)

1996: The World Tonight (ABS-CBN 2)

1997: The World Tonight (ABS-CBN 2)

1998: Saksi (GMA 7)

1999: GMA Network News (GMA-7)

2000: Frontpage: Ulat ni Mel Tiangco (GMA 7)

2001: Frontpage: Ulat ni Mel Tiangco (GMA 7)

2002: Frontpage: Ulat ni Mel Tiangco (GMA 7)

2003: TV Patrol (ABS-CBN 2)

2004: TV Patrol (ABS-CBN 2)

2005: TV Patrol World (ABS-CBN 2)

2006: 24 Oras (GMA 7) & TV Patrol World (ABS-CBN 2) [tied]

2007: Bandila (ABS-CBN 2)

2008: TV Patrol World (ABS-CBN 2)

2009: TV Patrol World (ABS-CBN 2)

2010: TV Patrol World (ABS-CBN 2)

2011: 24 Oras (GMA 7)

2012: TV Patrol (ABS-CBN 2)

2013: State of the Nation with Jessica Soho (GMA News TV)

2014: State of the Nation with Jessica Soho (GMA News TV)

2015: State of the Nation with Jessica Soho (GMA News TV)

2016: 24 Oras (GMA 7) & TV Patrol (ABS-CBN 2) [tied]

2017: TV Patrol (ABS-CBN 2)

2018: TV Patrol (ABS-CBN 2)

2019: TV Patrol (ABS-CBN 2)

2021: TV Patrol (ABS-CBN 2)

2022: 24 Oras (GMA 7)

Notes:

 TV Patrol is the longest-running News Program since 1987. They have 19 nominations (including TV Patrol World) & 15 won awards

Best Male Newscasters

1987: Noli de Castro (TV Patrol / ABS-CBN 2)

1988: Noli de Castro (TV Patrol / ABS-CBN 2)

1989: Bobby Guanzon  (GMA Balita / GMA 7)

1990: TG Kintanar  (Headline 13 / IBC 13)

1991: Jose Mari Velez (GMA Headline News / GMA 7)

1992: Frankie Evangelista (TV Patrol / ABS-CBN 2)

1993: Bobby Guanzon  (GMA Balita / GMA 7)

1994:

1995: Angelo Castro, Jr. (The World Tonight / ABS-CBN 2)

1996:

1997: Mike Enriquez (Saksi / GMA 7)

1998: Angelo Castro, Jr. (The World Tonight / ABS-CBN 2)

1999:

2000: Mike Enriquez (Saksi / GMA 7)

2001: Henry Omaga-Diaz (TV Patrol/ABS-CBN 2)

2002: Henry Omaga-Diaz (TV Patrol/ABS-CBN 2)

2003: Julius Babao (TV Patrol / ABS-CBN 2)

2004: Julius Babao (TV Patrol / ABS-CBN 2) and Martin Andanar (Big News / ABC 5) [tied]

2005: Julius Babao (TV Patrol World / ABS-CBN 2)

2006: Julius Babao (TV Patrol World / ABS-CBN 2)

2007: Julius Babao (TV Patrol World / ABS-CBN 2) and Alex Santos (TV Patrol Sabado / ABS-CBN 2) [tied]

2008: Julius Babao (TV Patrol World / ABS-CBN 2)

2009: Julius Babao (TV Patrol World / ABS-CBN 2)

2010: Julius Babao (TV Patrol World / ABS-CBN 2) and Daniel Razon (Ito Ang Balita / UNTV 37) [tied]

2011: Anthony Taberna (Iba-Balita ni Anthony Taberna / Studio 23)

2012: Ted Failon (TV Patrol / ABS-CBN 2)

2013: Julius Babao (Bandila / ABS-CBN 2)

2014: Erwin Tulfo (Aksyon / TV5)

2015: Erwin Tulfo (Aksyon / TV5)

2016: Erwin Tulfo (Aksyon / TV5)

2017: Arnold Clavio (Saksi / GMA 7)

2018: Raffy Tima (Balitanghali / GMA News TV 11)

2019: Raffy Tima (Balitanghali / GMA News TV 11)

2021: Julius Babao (Bandila / ABS-CBN 2)

2022:

Best Female Newscasters

1987:

1988:

1989: Helen Vela (GMA Balita / GMA 7)

1990:

1991: Helen Vela (GMA Balita / GMA 7)

1992: Loren Legarda (The World Tonight / ABS-CBN 2)

1993:

1994:

1995: Loren Legarda (The World Tonight / ABS-CBN 2)

1996:

1997:

1998: Karen Davila (Saksi / GMA 7) and Vicky Morales (GMA Network News / GMA 7) [tied]

1999:

2000: Mel Tiangco (Frontpage Ulat ni Mel Tinagco / GMA 7)

2001: Mel Tiangco (Frontpage Ulat ni Mel Tinagco / GMA 7)

2002: Mel Tiangco (Frontpage Ulat ni Mel Tinagco / GMA 7) and Korina Sanchez (TV Patrol/ABS-CBN 2) [tied]

2003: Korina Sanchez (TV Patrol / ABS-CBN 2)

2004: Korina Sanchez (TV Patrol / ABS-CBN 2)

2005: Vicky Morales (Saksi / GMA-7)

2006: Vicky Morales (Saksi / GMA-7)

2007: Mel Tiangco (24 Oras / GMA 7)

2008: Vicky Morales (Saksi / GMA-7)

2009: Vicky Morales (Saksi: Liga Ng Katotohanan / GMA-7)

2010: Karen Davila (TV Patrol World / ABS-CBN 2)

2011: Vicky Morales (Saksi / GMA-7)

2012: Vicky Morales (Saksi / GMA-7)

2013: Karen Davila (Bandila / ABS-CBN 2)

2014: Jessica Soho (State of the Nation / GMA News TV)

2015: Jessica Soho (State of the Nation / GMA News TV)

2016: Vicky Morales (24 Oras / GMA-7)

2017: Bernadette Sembrano (TV Patrol / ABS-CBN 2)

2018: Bernadette Sembrano (TV Patrol / ABS-CBN 2)

2019: Vicky Morales (24 Oras / GMA-7)

2021: Vicky Morales (24 Oras / GMA-7)

2022: Vicky Morales (24 Oras / GMA-7)

PMPC Star Awards for Television